Air Manila was a domestic airline in the Philippines. It was based out of Manila and operated propeller aircraft including the Handley Page Dart Herald, Fokker F27 Friendship and Lockheed L-188 Electra.

In the 1970s Air Manila obtained five second-hand Boeing 707s, with the goal of starting an international air service under the name of "Air Manila International". This move was opposed by Philippine Airlines (PAL), the national flag-carrier. Under government pressure, Air Manila and Filipinas Orient Airways were merged into PAL in 1973.

Fleet 
 Boeing 707-320B
 Lockheed L-188 Electra

Accidents and incidents
On 4 June 1976, Air Manila Flight 702, a Lockheed L-188 Electra, crashed after taking off from an airport in Guam, killing all 45 on board and one person on the ground.

References

External links
Air Manila International 707
Air Manila Fokker F-27

Companies based in Manila
Defunct airlines of the Philippines
Airlines established in 1964
Airlines disestablished in 1973
1973 disestablishments in the Philippines